Genasys Inc. is based in San Diego, California.  Its long-range acoustic device (LRAD) products are used for long-range acoustic hailing and mass notification. Its software-as-a-service products - Genasys Emergency Management (GEM) and Zonehaven - are used for emergency alerting, notifications, evacuations and repopulations. The company was previously named American Technology Corporation (ATC) until 2010 and as LRAD Corporation until 2019. The company's stock trades on the NASDAQ Capital Market with the ticker symbol "GNSS".

History
Genasys was founded in Utah by Elwood "Woody" Norris as the American Technology Corporation in 1980. From 1988 to early 1992 the company was inactive. Norris recapitalized the company as a Delaware Corporation in 1992. In 1996, the company launched its first directed sound technology and began engineering sound solutions for the commercial, government, and military markets. In response to the October 2000 attack on the USS Cole, the company's engineering team developed their long-range acoustic device (LRAD) product line. With the introduction of LRAD systems in 2003, the company created the acoustic hailing device (AHD) market, followed by the introduction of multidirectional mass notifications systems in 2012. The company acquired Genasys, a Madrid, Spain-based  software provider of location-based mass messaging solutions for emergency warning and workforce management in January 2018, and subsequently adopted the name Genasys for itself. In 2020, Genasys acquired Amika Mobile, an Ottawa, Canada-based enterprise software provider of critical event situational awareness, communication and control products. It was subsequently renamed Genasys Communications Canada. In a June 2021 acquisition, Genasys added Zonehaven, a California-based company specializing in emergency evacuation software services and resources.

Products
 Genasys Emergency Management (GEM), is a critical communications software system used by emergency management agencies and first responders to deliver public safety alerts.

 Zonehaven, provides fire, police, and emergency services departments software that analyzes geography, population, housing density, traffic flow, and other data that is used to send zone-based evacuation alerts, warnings and orders to the public. Zonehaven also provides a public-facing app that tracks evacuation warnings and orders in real time.

 Long-range acoustic device (LRAD), is a high-intensity directional acoustic array designed for long-range communication and mass notification.

References

External links

Investor information on Yahoo! Finance
SEC Filings

Electronics companies of the United States
Technology companies based in San Diego
Manufacturing companies based in San Diego
Electronics companies established in 1980
1980 establishments in Utah
Companies listed on the Nasdaq